Paracriodion is a genus of beetles in the family Cerambycidae, containing the following species:

 Paracriodion modestum (Buquet, 1852)
 Paracriodion romani (Aurivillius, 1926)

References

Cerambycini